Young Drunk Punk is a Canadian television sitcom, which debuted on City on January 21, 2015.

Created by Bruce McCulloch based on his autobiographical theatrical show of the same title, the series stars Tim Carlson as Ian McKay, a young punk rocker coming of age in Calgary, Alberta, with the series opening in 1980. The cast also includes McCulloch as Ian's father Lloyd, Tracy Ryan as his mother Helen, and Atticus Mitchell as his best friend Shinky.

The series was part of a production deal between City and CBC Television. Under the deal, the series had a second run on CBC Television in the fall of 2015, while City reciprocated by airing a second run of the CBC Television sitcom Mr. D.

In an interview with the Calgary Herald in May 2016, it was announced the show had not been picked up for a second season but McCulloch was working to find a new outlet for the series.

Cast
Bruce McCulloch as Lloyd McKay
Tracy Ryan as Helen McKay
Tim Carlson as Ian McKay
Atticus Mitchell as Andrew Shinky
Allie MacDonald as Belinda McKay

Episodes

References

External links

 
 

2015 Canadian television series debuts
2015 Canadian television series endings
2010s Canadian teen sitcoms
Television series set in the 1980s
Citytv original programming
English-language television shows
CBC Television original programming
Television shows filmed in Calgary
Television shows set in Calgary
Television series about families
Television series about teenagers